Beishanodon is an extinct genus of eucynodonts from Lower Triassic of China. The type and only species is Beishanodon youngi.

References

Cynognathians
Prehistoric cynodont genera
Early Triassic synapsids
Triassic synapsids of Asia
Fossil taxa described in 2010